Rogue Entertainment was an American computer game developer based in Dallas, Texas, which was active in the late 1990s. It was founded by Rich Fleider, Steve Maines, and Jim Molinets in 1994. Rogue Entertainment's office was in the same building as id Software, all of their games used game engines created by id Software, and two of their games were expansions for id Software's Quake series of games. The company's first game, Strife: Quest for the Sigil, was released as shareware on February 23, 1996, with the retail version later being released on May 31, 1996. Many former Rogue Entertainment employees moved to Nerve Software after Rogue Entertainment shut down.

Games developed by Rogue Entertainment

 Strife (1996) (PC)
 Quake Mission Pack No. 2: Dissolution of Eternity (1997) (PC)
 Quake II Mission Pack: Ground Zero (1998) (Windows)
 Quake II (1999) (Nintendo 64)
 American McGee's Alice (2000) (Windows)
 Counter-Strike: Condition Zero (never published, development passed back to Valve, later to Gearbox Software)

References

External links
Official website via Internet Archive
Rogue Entertainment at MobyGames

1994 establishments in Texas
2001 disestablishments in Texas
Companies based in Dallas
Defunct companies based in Texas
Video game companies established in 1994
Video game companies disestablished in 2001
Defunct video game companies of the United States
Video game development companies